The 2019 Leinster Senior Football Championship is the 2019 installment of the annual Leinster Senior Football Championship organised by Leinster GAA.

Teams
The Leinster championship was contested by 11 of the 12 county teams in Leinster, a province of Ireland. Kilkenny was the only county team not to compete.

Championship draw
The four teams who won the quarter-finals in the previous year were given byes to this year's quarter-finals. Six of the seven remaining teams play-off in the first round with the seventh team also receiving a bye to the quarter-finals.

Final
Dublin  best county

See also
 2019 All-Ireland Senior Football Championship
 2019 Connacht Senior Football Championship
 2019 Munster Senior Football Championship
 2019 Ulster Senior Football Championship

References

External links
 http://www.leinstergaa.ie/

2L
Leinster Senior Football Championship